Chuck Walker (born February 21, 1963) is an American professional stock car racing driver. He competes part-time in the ARCA Menards Series, driving the No. 02 Chevrolet SS for Young's Motorsports.

Racing career

ARCA Menards Series 
Walker made his ARCA Menards Series debut in 2003 (then the ARCA Re/Max Series) at Daytona International Speedway, finishing 18th. He attempted to qualify for the following race at Atlanta Motor Speedway but was unsuccessful. He returned to the series in 2009 running at Pocono Raceway and the Michigan International Speedway. He finished 33rd at Pocono due to a battery issue and failed to start at Michigan. He attempted multiple races over the following years, but failed to make any other races.

Motorsports career results

ARCA Menards Series

References

External links 

1963 births
Living people
ARCA Menards Series drivers
NASCAR drivers
Racing drivers from Charlotte, North Carolina
Racing drivers from North Carolina